Vladyslav Krayev (born 5 February 1995) is a professional Ukrainian football midfielder who plays for German NOFV-Oberliga Nord club Rostocker FC.

Career
Krayev is a product of the FC Metalist youth sportive school system.

He spent his career in the Ukrainian Premier League Reserves club FC Metalist. In spring 2016 Krayev was promoted to the Ukrainian Premier League's squad. He made his debut for Metalist Kharkiv in the Ukrainian Premier League in a match against FC Stal Dniprodzerzhynsk on 23 April 2016.

References

External links
Statistics at FFU website (Ukr)

1995 births
Living people
Ukrainian footballers
Association football midfielders
FC Metalist Kharkiv players
FC Metalist 1925 Kharkiv players
FC Dinamo-Auto Tiraspol players
FC Telavi players
FC Hirnyk-Sport Horishni Plavni players
FC Peremoha Dnipro players
Ukrainian Premier League players
Ukrainian Second League players
Moldovan Super Liga players
Ukrainian First League players
Ukrainian expatriate footballers
Expatriate footballers in Moldova
Ukrainian expatriate sportspeople in Moldova
Expatriate footballers in Georgia (country)
Ukrainian expatriate sportspeople in Georgia (country)
Expatriate footballers in Germany
Ukrainian expatriate sportspeople in Germany